The ICC Women's T20 World Cup (known as the ICC Women's World Twenty20 until 2019) is the biennial international championship for women's Twenty20 International cricket. The event is organised by the sport's governing body, the International Cricket Council (ICC), with the first edition having been held in England in 2009. For the first three tournaments, there were eight participants, but this number has been raised to ten from the 2014 edition onwards. In July 2022, the ICC announced that the Bangladesh would host the 2024 tournament and that England would host the 2026 tournament. The number of teams in at the 2026 tournament is also set to increase to twelve.

At each tournament, a set number of teams qualify automatically, with the remaining teams determined by the World Twenty20 Qualifier. Australia, having won the tournament six times, are the most successful team.

Qualification 

Qualification is determined by the ICC Women's Twenty20 international rankings and a qualification event, the ICC Women's World Twenty20 Qualifier. Until 2014, six teams were determined by the top six teams of the ICC Women's Twenty20 International rankings at the time of the draw and the remaining two places determined by a qualification process. In 2014 edition, six places were determined by the top eight teams of the ICC Women's T20I rankings, with the host country and three qualifiers joining them in the tournament. 2016 onwards, seven places were determined by the top eight teams of the ICC Women's T20I rankings, with the host country and two qualifiers joining them in the tournament.

Summary

Performance of teams 

Note:
 The number in bracket indicates number of wins in tied matches by Super Overs however these are considered half a win regardless of the result. The win percentage excludes no results and counts ties (irrespective of a tiebreaker) as half a win.
 Teams are sorted by their best performance, then winning percentage, then (if equal) by alphabetical order.

Team results by tournament
The table below provides an overview of the performances of teams in the ICC World Twenty20. 
For each tournament, the number of teams in each finals tournament (in brackets) are shown.

Legend
  – Champions
  – Runners-up
  – Semi-finalist
 R1 – Round 1 (group stage)
 Q – Qualified, Still in Competition
 – Did not qualify
 – Did not enter

Entry of players in groups

Debutant teams in each tournament

Other results

Results of host teams

Results of defending champions

Records

Team records

Highest innings totals

Lowest innings totals

Individual records

Highest individual score

Best bowling figures

Records by tournament

Most runs in the tournament

Most wickets in the tournament

Awards

Player of the tournament

Player of the final

See also

 ICC Men's T20 World Cup
 Women's Cricket World Cup

References

External links 

 ICC Women's World Twenty20 on Cricinfo
 ICC World Twenty20 2012 on International Cricket Council Official Website

 
Twenty20
Recurring sporting events established in 2009
World championships in cricket
Women's Twenty20 cricket international competitions